Daniel Soulage (14 February 1942 – 14 September 2020) was a French politician. 

Soulage was born in Monflanquin, Lot-et-Garonne, and served as deputy mayor of his hometown starting in 1978. He was elected to the mayoralty in 1983, retaining the office until 2008. Soulage was a member of the Senate of France from 2001 to 2011, representing Lot-et-Garonne department. Between 1993 and 1997, he served on the National Assembly from Lot-et-Garonne's 3rd constituency. While a deputy, Soulage was a member of the Union for French Democracy. During his senatorial tenure, he joined the Centrist Alliance and caucused with the Centrist Union.

References

1942 births
2020 deaths
People from Lot-et-Garonne
Politicians from Nouvelle-Aquitaine
Union for French Democracy politicians
Democratic Movement (France) politicians
Centrist Alliance politicians
Deputies of the 10th National Assembly of the French Fifth Republic
French Senators of the Fifth Republic
Senators of Lot-et-Garonne
Mayors of places in Nouvelle-Aquitaine